"Today" is a 2014 single by German musical group Scooter featuring Australian singer Vassy. It was released as the second single from their seventeenth album The Fifth Chapter.

Background
The song made its debut on 5 September 2014 as 1-track download. It was released as maxi-single and as 2-track CD single on 26 September 2014.

Track listings
Download (1-track)

CD single (2-track)

Download (Maxi-Single)

Charts

Release history

References 

2014 singles
2014 songs
Scooter (band) songs
Songs written by H.P. Baxxter
Songs written by Jens Thele
Songs written by Michael Simon (DJ)
Vassy (singer) songs